Porky's Pet is a 1936 Warner Bros. Looney Tunes cartoon directed by Jack King. The short was released on July 11, 1936, and stars Porky Pig.

Plot
A mailman heads to Porky Pig's house and delivers a telegram to Porky. When Porky reads the telegram, he sees it is an offer from a big shot producer in Broadway, New York City, who wants Porky and his pet ostrich, Lulu, in his show, offering $75 a day. Porky wants the job, so he tells Lulu the good news and takes her on a leash to the train station.

Once there a passenger train speeds right past the station and Porky has to change the signal to stop the second train. Porky and Lulu get on board, but the conductor kicks them off, on account of a "no pets" policy. Porky tells Lulu to go down the tracks so he can pick her up when the train passes by. Porky gets on board and the train departs. When it passes by Lulu, Porky grabs her and pulls her in. Realizing what will happen if the conductor finds out, Porky shoves Lulu under his seat, but Lulu insists on poking her head out. She then squeezes out and swallows passengers' personal belongings, ao. an accordion.

Just then, the conductor comes asking the passengers for tickets. Porky sees him, shoves the noisy accordion down Lulu's throat to her stomach, stuffs her inside a guitar case and trims her sticking out tail feathers. When the conductor comes up to Porky, Lulu blows her cover by squawking, pushing her legs out, and taking the conductor on a wild ride to the other side of the coach. Angered, the conductor throws Lulu and Porky out of the train from the observation car. Porky spots a handcar in a siding and a cow grazing. He and Lulu hop on the handcar, and Porky grabs the cow's tail. The cow happily takes them down the track, and even outruns the train, much to the conductor's shock.

Home media
The short was released on DVD on Porky Pig 101, Disc 1.

References

External links

1936 films
1936 animated films
1930s American animated films
1936 comedy films
Animated films about animals
Animated films about birds
Films about pigs
Films scored by Norman Spencer (composer)
Films directed by Jack King
Films about pets
Porky Pig films
Films set on trains
Looney Tunes shorts
American black-and-white films
1930s English-language films